Hasee Toh Phasee (If she smiles, she is trapped) is a 2014 Indian Hindi-language romantic comedy-drama film directed by Vinil Mathew and produced by Karan Johar and Anurag Kashyap. The film features Parineeti Chopra and Sidharth Malhotra in lead roles. It released on 7 February 2014 and earned  crore worldwide, thus emerging as a commercial success at the box office.

It received positive reviews from critics, with praise for its story, music, humor, cinematography and cast performances, with particular praise directed towards Chopra's performance.  

At the 60th Filmfare Awards, Hasee Toh Phasee received 3 nominations, including Best Lyricist (Amitabh Bhattacharya for "Zehnaseeb") and Best Male Playback Singer (Shekhar Ravjiani for "Zehnaseeb).

Plot
Nikhil is a struggling businessman who thinks he loves Karishma, an actress. Nikhil is characterised as a person who believes that once committed to a girl, there should be no straying. Nikhil ask Karishma's father to help him with ₹50 million before marriage to earn a contract. But Karishma father refuse his request. Thus putting him in a position to prove himself without borrowing money from his in-law.

Then Nikhil meets Meeta, Karishma's younger sister, whom he had a brief encounter with seven year ago. Meeta, an IITian in Chemical Engineering and PhD., is a super-intelligent geek with unusual habits and tics, who ran away seven years ago to China after stealing money from her father for her project leading to her father heart attack on the day of Karishma's elder sisters wedding. Now, just a week before Nikhil and Karishma's wedding, Meeta has turned up to meet her father, but Karishma fearing that Meeta sudden appearance might ruin their wedding as previously. So Karishma assign Nikhil to watch over Meeta and keep her away from her father.

Nikhil and Meeta become close during the seven days preceeding Nikhil wedding. He learns that Meeta has returned, intending to steal again and Meeta has taken a hefty loan of ₹100 million from a Chinese investor for her research by forging her father's signature. The deadline for payback is over, and an extension of three days was given, during which she has to steal money from her father's account to save him from the investor's goons. Nikhil help Meeta hack her father's account but advises her to apologise to her family. Meeta apologies and reunites with her family.

Meeta cannot gather the courage to steal her father's money and tells her father the truth, but her father forgives her and let her take the money. Meeta seemingly tell her father about her feeling for Nikhil. Meanwhile Nikhil realises he is marrying the wrong girl. Nikhil contemplate his life and love between Karishma and meeta. Nikhil goes to Karishma house to break off the wedding, but sees Karishma happy and joyful with her cousins and friends, he returns home, realising the complications and thus he cannot hurt Karishma. Nikhil meet Meeta and scolds Meeta for being selfish and only thinking of her benefit and tells her to go away from them. Mr. Adlani, an investor, shows his interest in Nikhil's idea.

On the wedding day, Meeta leaves her house without informing anyone, leaving her mobile phone in Karishma's room. Nikhil tries to call her and sends many texts, which go unanswered. On reaching the mandap, Meeta's father informs him that she has left for China. Karishma finds Meeta's phone in her room, reads Nikhil messages, and realises she has lost Nikhil. During the wedding, she asks Nikhil to leave, which Nikhil hesitantly oblige. Heartbroken Meeta tries to end her life, but gather her courage and goes back to profess her love for Nikhil. She and Nikhil reunite at the same place and predicament they first meet 7 years ago. They both express their love for each other and share a kiss.

The movie ends with Nikhil and Meeta at the airport, scheduled to travel to Germany. Meeta tells him that there is another problem waiting for them.

Cast

Sidharth Malhotra as Nikhil Bharadwaj 
 Parineeti Chopra as Dr. Meeta Solanki Bharadwaj 
 Adah Sharma as Karishma Solanki
 Manoj Joshi as Devesh Solanki, Meeta and Karishma's father
 Sharat Saxena as S.B Bharadwaj, Nikhil's father
 Neena Kulkarni as Nikhil's mother
 Sameer Sharma as Nikhil's brother
 Anil Mange as Abhinandan
 Sameer Khakhar as Alpesh Bhai Solanki
 Sunil Upadhyay as Salim
 Garvita Sharma as Amrita
 Gulzar Dastur as Nikhil's aunt
 Lily Patel as Baa, Meeta's grandmother
 Akash Dabas as Nikhil's friend
 Karan Johar in a special appearance
 Tinnu Anand as Mukesh Adnani (special appearance)
 Jaymeet Sinha as Ruhaan
 Bobby Darling in the song "Drama Queen"
Namit Shah as young Nikhil

Production

Development
Karan Johar's production house Dharma Productions financed this film along with Phantom Productions, which is run by four filmmakers - Anurag Kashyap, Vikramaditya Motwane, Vikas Bahl and Madhu Mantena.

Casting
Anurag Kashyap, who is very excited about this project, said, "The story works with fresh faces, but requires a high level of chemistry and maturity in the performances. After spending months shortlisting various actors, we finalised Sidharth and Parineeti." Reportedly, Adah Sharma is playing the second female lead in the movie and the sister of the film's female protagonist. To capture the seven-year period covered in the film, Vinil Matthew wanted Parineeti Chopra to have different hairstyles.

Filming
Filming began on 18 April 2013. On talking about the director Vinil Mathew, Sidharth Malhotra, who would be cast as a middle class working man in the film, said, "It didn't feel like the first day of shoot because he is so sorted and knows exactly what he wants. He made us rehearse a lot during a two-month workshop before shooting began". In an Interview Sidharth says, he plays a character who is stressed out, lost and sentimental. He meets a girl who is a bit cracked. Actress Parineeti Chopra reported that her character was a quite difficult one. It is the first collaboration for both the protagonists with each other, but however, none complained and instead, both were praising each other to be energetic and tireless. The fact that actress Adah Sharma was also involved in the cast as one of the lead characters was supposed to be kept a secret as the producers wanted to make an official announcement about it. But it was later revealed as Adah was seen shooting for the film at the Bandra Bandstand Promenade.

Soundtrack 

Shankar–Ehsaan–Loy were initially signed on as composers for the film. But eventually they opted out, and songs featured in the film were composed by Vishal–Shekhar, while the lyrics are written by Amitabh Bhattacharya and Kumaar. The first single "Drama Queen", sung by Shreya Ghoshal and Vishal Dadlani, was launched on 23 December 2013. The song "Zehnaseeb", sung by Chinmayi along with Shekhar Ravjiani, was launched on 3 January 2014. There are six original tracks and a remix track in the album. The complete soundtrack album was released on 6 January 2014. The remix version of "Drama Queen" was later uploaded as a single on the official YouTube channel of Dharma Productions. A Gujarati rap song was entirely written and composed by Khamosh Shah, which is there in the film but not on the soundtrack. The "Punjabi Wedding Song" was choreographed by Karishma Chavan.

Track listing

Critical reception
The film received positive reviews, with particular praise directed towards the lead cast performances. Meena Iyer of The Times of India gave it 3.5/5 stars, stating, "Hasee Toh Phasee is for the romantics who like their martinis stirred not shaken. This romantic comedy mirrors the quirks in human nature subtly and provides humour in everyday situations; in the family and amongst friends. If you're looking to rediscover the magic of goofy love around Valentines, give HTP a shot."
Taran Adarsh of Bollywood Hungama gave it 3.5/5 stars and said, "Hasee Toh Phasee dares to be distinctive. This one's *not* merely about opposites falling in love. This one's a quirky love tale involving two individuals, shades different from the mundane stuff on matters of heart".
Sukanya Verma of Rediff gave the movie with same ratings and wrote, "Hasee Toh Phasee is that rare film that allows you to know the two people you're investing in. And the closer you get, the more they win you over. Parineeti sinks her teeth into this misunderstood kook without a trace of self-consciousness or exaggeration. If that's not magical enough, what Hasee Toh Phasee celebrates certainly is. That the only high you need is life, love and smiles."

Mohar Basu of Koimoi gave it 3/5 stars and wrote, "The film is both pleasantly surprising and utterly baffling in equal amounts. Hasee Toh Phasee will definitely win your heart for the symbiotically arranged, pitch perfect chemistry of Parineeti Chopra and Sidharth Malhotra. It was passionate and compelling, almost to make me wish that they were a real life couple and that alone becomes the winning shot."
A review from India Today rated it with 3/5 stars, stating, "Hasee Toh Phasee is a refreshing, much-needed entry in the contemporary romcom genre, which has lately seen a series of uninspiring films. It's largely to do with the presence of an unseen pairing with great chemistry - Parineeti Chopra and Sidharth Malhotra - and Mathew and writer Harshvardhan Kulkarni's perky take on love."

Tushar Joshi of Daily News and Analysis gave the movie with 3/5 stars, writing, "The lead pair of Chopra and Malhotra make Hasee Toh Phasee enjoyable and believable. This odd pairing works only because these two actors take an effort to play their characters with utmost sincerity. Watch it if you want to see a different take on modern day romance. Hasee Toh Phasee is worth a watch for a solid act put together by its lead pair.".

Box office

India
According to Box Office India, Hasee Toh Phasee had a reasonable start in major metros in most parts of the country. The movie grossed a decent  in the first week. In the second week, the movie's screen count fell due to the release of Yash Raj Films' Gunday.

Overseas
The opening weekend gross of film was approx $1.027 million ( 64.1 million).

Awards and nominations

See also
 List of Hindi films of 2014

References

External links

 

Indian romantic comedy-drama films
2010s Hindi-language films
2014 romantic comedy-drama films
2014 films
Films scored by Vishal–Shekhar
Reliance Entertainment films
Films about Indian weddings
2014 comedy films
2014 drama films